João Ricardo Pereira Queirós (born 22 April 1998) is a Portuguese professional footballer who plays as a central defender for G.D. Chaves.

Club career
Born in Barroselas, Viana do Castelo, Queirós played youth football for a host of clubs, joining S.C. Braga at the age of 16. On 21 May 2017, in the last day of the season and while still a junior, he made his senior debut with the reserves, featuring the full 90 minutes in a 1–1 home draw against Sporting CP B in the Segunda Liga.

On 18 July 2017, Queirós signed a five-year contract with Bundesliga team 1. FC Köln. During his tenure in Germany, however, he was solely associated to the reserve side.

Queirós returned to his homeland in June 2018, joining Sporting CP and being assigned to their newly created under-23 team. On 8 August 2019, still owned by Köln, he moved to Willem II of the Dutch Eredivisie.

In August 2021, Queirós was released from his contract and signed with Liga Portugal 2 club G.D. Chaves.

International career
Queirós won his only cap for Portugal at under-21 level on 25 May 2018, coming on as a late substitute in the 3–2 friendly victory over Italy in Estoril.

References

External links

Portuguese League profile 

1998 births
Living people
People from Viana do Castelo
Sportspeople from Viana do Castelo District
Portuguese footballers
Association football defenders
Primeira Liga players
Liga Portugal 2 players
S.C. Braga B players
Sporting CP footballers
G.D. Chaves players
Juventude de Pedras Salgadas players
Regionalliga players
1. FC Köln II players
1. FC Köln players
Willem II (football club) players
Portugal youth international footballers
Portugal under-21 international footballers
Portuguese expatriate footballers
Expatriate footballers in Germany
Expatriate footballers in the Netherlands
Portuguese expatriate sportspeople in Germany
Portuguese expatriate sportspeople in the Netherlands